The United States Center for SafeSport is an American 501(c)(3) nonprofit organization established in 2017 under the auspices of the Protecting Young Victims from Sexual Abuse and Safe Sport Authorization Act of 2017. SafeSport is tasked with addressing the problem of sexual abuse of minors and amateur athletes in Olympic sports in the United States. Its primary focus, as to which it has exclusive jurisdiction in the US, is to review allegations of sexual misconduct, and to impose sanctions up to lifetime banning of a person from involvement in all Olympic sports. One function of SafeSport is to provide a public central database of sanctioned individuals across all sports.

In 2019-20, the Center imposed temporary measures in 6% of cases - those where the charges were most serious and demanded to be addressed most urgently. In 71% of cases in which final sanctions were imposed, they consisted of some level of suspension or ineligibility. As of October 2021, the Center had sanctioned 1,100 people, with the most serious sanctions being permanent ineligibility. SafeSport has been criticized by athletes such as gymnastic Olympic gold medal winner Aly Raisman ("it's a complete mess, and the priority doesn't seem to be the safety and well-being of athletes"), and by politicians such as U.S. Senators Richard Blumenthal ("There is simply no way that SafeSport can be given a passing grade") and Jerry Moran (SafeSport must be more transparent, and every athlete-victim he visited with: "had little or no confidence in SafeSport").

Sexual misconduct investigations

Responsibilities and operations
SafeSport's primary responsibility, as to which it has exclusive jurisdiction in the United States, is to review allegations of sexual misconduct, and to impose sanctions up to lifetime banning of a person from involvement in all Olympic sports. In the case of sexual abuse or sexual misconduct, the Center’s exclusive jurisdiction means that none of the other U.S. Olympic or Paralympic organizations have authority to investigate sexual misconduct in their own ranks. There is no statute of limitations. Reporting to SafeSport, both online and by telephone, is key to its mission.

Upon receiving a report, Center staff considers the number of individuals who allege that they have experienced misconduct, whether they were minors, the number of witnesses, and the volume of and difficulty in obtaining evidence. The severity of abuse and misconduct can range from inappropriate conduct (such as butt slapping), to rape and forcible sexual assault. On a discretionary basis, SafeSport also reviews and acts on allegations other than those of sexual abuse or sexual misconduct, such as emotional abuse, bullying, and harassment. SafeSport collaborates with law enforcement on report investigations.

Database
Upon SafeSport disciplining an individual, its Centralized Disciplinary Database provides  public online access to published actions regarding sanctioned individuals, and their current status. In the database, the Center publishes the names only of those sanctioned adults who the Center believes pose a potential risk to US Olympic and Paralympic athletes and affiliated organizations. If a sanction has run its course, the sanctioned person's name is removed from the public database, often leaving no public record of the allegation and sanction. As a result of the cloak of confidentiality applied by SafeSport, the nature and severity of the alleged misconduct, the evidence gathered by investigators, and whatever aggravating or mitigating factors might have influenced an arbitrator's decision on appeal are - barring leaks - unknown and unavailable to anyone Other than the involved parties and SafeSport.

Education
The Center also provides education to US Olympic and Paralympic organizations.

Funding

In 2019, the Center had a budget of $10.5 million; U.S. Senators Richard Blumenthal and Jerry Moran proposed measures to increase funding of the SafeSport program in 2019, which were adopted in 2020, more than doubling its funding to $23 million. Its first CEO, Shellie Pfohl, resigned in 2019, and said that the Center had been "inundated" with more than 1,800 reports of sexual misconduct or sexual abuse, and lacked the resources to deal with all the cases. In October 2020 the Center had approximately 1,200 open investigations, and about half of its staff were devoted to clearing that backlog; by October 2021, it had resolved 40% of its backlog. In 2020 the Center had 91 employees, 57 contractors, 13 outside counsel, and 3 interns.

President Donald Trump signed a new law in October 2020 that requires the United States Olympic & Paralympic Committee (USOPC) to provide $20 million of funding to the Center every year. The USOPC, in turn, raised part of that $20 million by charging national federations in accordance with the number of cases their members bring to the Center.  The Center also receives money from individual national governing bodies and a federal grant, as well as other sources.

Cases and outcomes
As of July 2020, the Center had received over 4,000 incident reports of sexual abuse in the three years of its existence. Sexual misconduct claims in U.S. Olympic & Paralympic sports rose 55% between 2018 and 2019, and included 2,770 reports in 2019. As of February 2020, the Center had received almost 5,000 reports from the time it opened, and had sanctioned 627 people; by October 2021, it had sanctioned 1,100 people.

Temporary measures
In the year from July 1, 2019, through June 30, 2020, the Center imposed temporary measures in 123 of 2,027 cases that were created (6%). The Center imposes temporary measures only when it believes that they are necessary, based on the evidentiary support for the allegations, the severity of the allegations, and/or the perceived risk to athletes or the sport community.

Appeals
The Center guarantees appeal hearings on temporary suspensions within 72 hours, before an independent arbitrator, if requested by the Respondent. At the hearing before the arbitrator, the Respondent who has been sanctioned, usually with their attorney, argues to have their punishment reduced or revoked. The arbitrator considers the reasonableness of the suspension based on the evidence and the seriousness of the allegations. The arbitrator's decision is issued within 24 hours of the close of the hearing, and is not subject to appeal.

At a temporary measures hearing the arbitrator does not resolve whether the Respondent committed a violation, or what the appropriate sanctions should be if a violation is found.  It is not a hearing on the merits. The hearing is strictly limited to determining if there was reasonable cause to impose the temporary measures.

If an arbitrator modifies or denies temporary measures, the Center nevertheless can again impose  temporary measures in the same case in the future, if it receives material information that it did not have previously.

In addition, the arbitrator's decision is inadmissible, and is not given any weight, if there is a subsequent final decision with sanctions imposed, which in turn goes to arbitration.

Cases
The Center refers to an allegation of misconduct as a "case" when the Center has what it deems to be enough information to begin investigating.

In the year from July 1, 2019 – June 30, 2020, the Center marked 2,460 cases as "resolved." Most of those cases were "resolved," however, by the Center not taking them on. In those cases, the Center  instead booked them as jurisdictional or subject matter closures (e.g., the Center determined that it lacked personal jurisdiction over a respondent, or lacked subject matter jurisdiction over reported behavior). In 424 cases, the Center referred reports of alleged abuse to law enforcement. 

The 2022 Yates Report by former US Attorney General Sally Yates found that SafeSport "reached a formal resolution in just 8 percent of all the cases it investigated during that period." The Center imposed sanctions in 262 cases; in 71% consisting of some level of suspension or ineligibility.  In 95 cases, "ineligibility until further notice" was the most serious sanction imposed by the Center. In 57 cases, "permanent ineligibility" was the most serious sanction imposed by the Center. In 33 cases, the sanction was "suspension for a specified period of time," in 58 cases it was probation, while in 19 cases it was a warning.

From February 2018 through June 2020, 63% of cases opened were resolved in one to three months. However, in 14% of cases it took SafeSport over a year to conclude their investigation-in some of those cases, more time was required where law enforcement was involved, or claimants were reluctant or nonresponsive.

Merits arbitration appeals
From July 1, 2019, through June 30, 2020, of 17 cases referred to Merits Arbitration and decided, 11 of them (65%) resulted in the Center’s findings and sanctions being substantially upheld, 3 cases resulted in them being substantially modified, and 3 cases in them being overturned. In February 2022, ESPN reported that on appeal, 42% of SafeSport's sanctions had been modified, reduced, or removed. SafeSport keeps arbitration decisions confidential, rather than making them available to the public. The Yates Report noted that SafeSport has "instituted an appeals process unlike that even afforded criminal defendants. Rather than reviewing sanctions imposed by the Center for an abuse of discretion, as is required by the SafeSport Code, SafeSport gives respondents the right to what is effectively an entirely new fact-finding process, requiring the claimant to go through the process all over again... it is clear that teams, the League, and [the national governing body] should not rely on SafeSport referrals alone...."

Criticisms

SafeSport has been criticized for not being sufficiently independent from the United States Olympic Committee, from which it receives most of its funding. The Committee has an inherent interest in creating a positive image of US sports and their successful athletes and coaches, and in avoiding liability. An example that has been pointed to is that SafeSport was not the first organization to publish a list of banned coaches; critics questioned why the organization created to protect athletes was not leading that effort. It is a claim SafeSport officials denied, but which was the subject of focus of a new law. U.S. Senators Richard Blumenthal and Jerry Moran proposed measures to strengthen oversight of the SafeSport program in 2019, which were adopted in 2020. Still, in 2022 attorney John Manly said that SafeSport is solely designed to provide public relations cover for the US Olympic Committee, and that it "does an excellent job of keeping the facts secret."

In September 2020, SafeSport temporarily suspended paralympic Team USA swimmer Robert Griswold for alleged misconduct, but it reinstated him one month later. However, another paralympic swimmer, who has the mental capacity of a 5-year-old, alleged that subsequent to Griswold's reinstatement, Griswold violently and repeatedly raped him, including in the room that SafeSport allowed Griswold to share with the claimant at the Paralympic Games in 2021. The claimant has filed a lawsuit against Griswold, SafeSport (for negligence, claiming SafeSport failed to protect Egbert from Griswold, despite previous complaints of sexual assault by Griswold having been made to SafeSport in 2020), and the U.S. Olympic & Paralympic Committee in federal court in Colorado. 

At a September 2021 hearing before the US Senate Judiciary Committee, US former Olympic gold medal gymnast Aly Raisman testified: "I don't like SafeSport ... it's a complete mess, and the priority doesn't seem to be the safety and well-being of athletes."

New York State Senator & Judiciary Chairman Brad Hoylman wrote a letter to U.S. Senator Maria Cantwell on September 24, 2021, requesting that the US Senate Committee on Commerce, Science, and Transportation engage in oversight of SafeSport, and step in to ensure that SafeSport is adequately conducting investigations. He referred to what he called SafeSport's failure to carry out impartial and thorough investigations and ensure the safety of athletes it is charged with protecting. He highlighted the fact that despite serious outstanding allegations of sexual misconduct, sexual coercion, and other violent behaviors by former friends, peers, and current teammates, and an ongoing investigation, fencer Alen Hadzic was allowed to travel to Tokyo as an alternate for the 2021 US Olympic fencing team.

In 2021 a female rugby referee reported sexual misconduct by a man to SafeSport, misconduct which the man did not dispute, only to have SafeSport then investigate and attempt to punish her (the victim) for sharing documents related to the case. 

In February 2022, in a Nightline program on criticisms of SafeSport entitled "Sports misconduct watchdog faces crisis of confidence," U.S. Senator Blumenthal said: "There is simply no way that SafeSport can be given a passing grade," that "these young athletes deserve better protection," and that SafeSport does not have his confidence and trust. U.S. Senator Moran said that every athlete-victim he visited with: "had little or no confidence in SafeSport." The Senators said that they believe that more transparency is required from SafeSport - which does not make public its investigative findings or arbitration decisions - to protect young athletes, and that SafeSport must make its work public. Academics, athletes, and activists have also criticized SafeSport for lack of transparency. Blumenthal said: "The burden is on them to show they can do better. If not, we'll change the leadership. We'll provide more resources, we'll alter the rules. But ... the burden is on SafeSport to show they can do the job, which so far they haven't.... we're going to hold them accountable." SafeSport CEO Ju’Riese Colón originally agreed to an interview with ABC News and ESPN for the program, but ultimately declined, and instead a SafeSport spokesman spoke on behalf of SafeSport and described it as "an incredible success story".

Nancy Hogshead-Makar, a former Olympic gold medalist swimmer and now an attorney, described it as "defendant-friendly." Attorney and law professor Jack Wiener, who represents three claimants pro bono in the SafeSport matter of fencer Alen Hadzic, said to The New York Times: "SafeSport’s system is rigged. It tilts overwhelmingly against victims of sexual assault."

Notable cases
John Coughlin (1985–2019), figure skater
Alen Hadzic (born 1991), fencer
Mauro Hamza, Egyptian fencing coach 	
Stephen Kovacs (1972–2022), fencer and fencing coach, died in prison
Ross Miner (born 1991), figure skater and coach
George H. Morris (born 1938), equestrian and coach
Alberto Salazar (born 1958), track coach
Keith Sanderson (born 1975), sport shooter
Angelo Taylor (born 1978), track and field athlete

See also 
USA Gymnastics sex abuse scandal

References

External links
United States Center for SafeSport
Brianna Sacks (July 8, 2022). "Six women have accused Alen Hadzic of sexual assault. More than a year later, there's no resolution in the case, and he is still allowed to compete.", BuzzFeed News.
Irvin Muchnik (September 24, 2022). "Why is the U.S. Olympic agency meant to stop sexual abuse investigating its top critic?; Center for SafeSport is supposed to investigate alleged abusers. But no one has accused Jonathan Little of a crime," ("Little himself says ... 'Calling SafeSport about a coach committing abuse is like calling the Vatican to report a priest.'"), Salon.
Sally Jenkins (October 3, 2022). "Another 'report' on abuse in women's sports. When is enough enough?" (SafeSport is "a false front … little more than another coverup operation, a litigation-avoidance ploy and bottomless pit into which to dump complaints and disguise inaction ... abuser-friendly .. and a sham."), The Washington Post.

Organizations based in the United States
Organizations based in Denver
Child abuse-related organizations
Sexual abuse victims advocacy
Child sexual abuse in the United States
Non-profit organizations based in Colorado
Sexual assaults in the United States
Sexual harassment
Sexual misconduct allegations
Sports controversies
Sports scandals in the United States
United States at the Olympics
Violence against children
Youth organizations based in Colorado
501(c)(3) organizations
Sexual assault in sports